The Great Western Railway (GWR) 3000 Class was a class of 2-8-0 steam locomotive consisting of the ex-Railway Operating Division ROD 2-8-0. These were built by North British Locomotive Co. between 1917-1918. No examples have been preserved.

The GWR borrowed several ROD 2-8-0s during the First World War but these were returned to the government after the end of the war.  In 1919, GWR bought 20 virtually new RODs, and numbered them 3000-19.  A further 84 were hired in July 1919, and were numbered 3020-99 and 6000-3, but these were returned in October 1922.  In 1925, the GWR bought 80 engines (including some previously hired) and numbered them 3020-99.

Overhaul and sorting
In 1926/7 the GWR sorted the eighty RODs bought in 1925 which had been given nos. 3020–99 into two batches, which involved considerable renumbering. The worst fifty were touched up and returned to traffic with steel fireboxes and painted the original R.O.D. black and renumbered 3050–99; they were run until they failed, when they were withdrawn – after July 1930, only one remained, being withdrawn the following year. The best thirty were thoroughly overhauled, fitted with copper fireboxes and painted G.W. standard green, they also acquired Swindon fittings, including top feed and brass safety valve casing, and were renumbered 3020–49. Nos. 3000–19 (bought 1919) were also overhauled similarly to the new nos. 3020–49 between 1927 and 1929, but were not further renumbered.

World War II
The GWR borrowed 30 Class O4 from the LNER in 1940 but returned them between 1941 and 1943.

British Railways

Forty-six of the RODs entered British Railways service in 1948. Five locomotives (numbers 3011, 3015, 3024, 3036 and 3041) were still in service in 1957 but they had all withdrawn and scrapped by 1960.  None of the GWR RODs has survived to preservation.

Modelling
In November 2011, Bachmann released a OO gauge ready to run model of the 3000 class. This complements kits in various gauges.

References

External links 

Class ROD Details at Rail UK

2-8-0 locomotives
3000
Scrapped locomotives
Standard gauge steam locomotives of Great Britain
Railway locomotives introduced in 1919
Freight locomotives
NBL locomotives